Edna Leedom Doelger (1896 – October 15, 1937) was an American actress, who appeared in Broadway productions during the 1920s.

Early life
Edna Leedom was born in 1896. She was from Philadelphia, Pennsylvania. She worked as a salesgirl and sang in the choir at Memorial Baptist Church on Broad and Masters Streets in Philadelphia.

Career
Leedom made her stage debut in vaudeville. She was in five Broadway theatre productions between 1923 and 1928. She was in three seasons of Ziegfeld Follies, including productions with Beryl Halley and a sketch called In Bed And Out with Lupino Lane. In 1926, Leedom performed with Peggy Fears in No Foolin. In 1927, Leedom was the leading lady alongside Guy Robertson in Lovely Lady, a Shubert production. In February 1923, Leedom made headlines for quitting the production after an argument with Mabel Elaine. She became ill with appendicitis and did not return to the production. She did not appear on the stage after.

Personal life
Leedom married Billy Edmunds. They later divorced. Leedom married Harry Tighe, an actor. They later divorced. In 1926, Leedom married Dave Stamper, a composer of Ziegfeld Follies. They divorced in 1927. On March 9, 1928, Leedom married Frank G. Doelger, son of brewer Peter Doelger. They had a son, Frank G. Jr.

Leedom died on October 15, 1937, at her home at 33-41 84th Street in Jackson Heights, Queens.

References

External links

Discography of American Historical Recordings: Edna Leedom

1896 births
1937 deaths
People from Philadelphia
People from New York City
American stage actresses
American musical theatre actresses
20th-century American actresses
20th-century American women singers
20th-century American singers